The National Ranching Heritage Center, a museum of ranching history, is located on the campus of Texas Tech University in Lubbock, Texas. The NRHC features almost fifty authentic ranch buildings dating from the late 18th to the mid-20th century. These structures include a railroad depot, homesteads, barn, blacksmith shop, schoolhouse, windmills and other historic structures. One views the exhibits through a self-guided walking tour. It is free to the public.

History
The center was established in 1969 by the Ranching Heritage Association.

AIn 2013, Miguel Martinez, a 14-year-old from Lubbock, was impaled through the chest by the horn of a bull statue while playing hide-and-seek at night in front of the National Ranching Heritage Center. He died from his injuries.

On January 22, 2019, the Heritage Center launched an exhibit which shows the importance of the different breeds of cattle brought into the southwestern United States. The first cattle, explains the exhibit, were Andalusian brought to the continent in the second voyage of Christopher Columbus. Later breeds, such as Hereford, Angus, and the Texas Longhorn shaped the destiny of the American West.

Gallery

See also
 American Wind Power Center

References

External links 

 The National Ranching Heritage Center official site
 Information on the National Ranching Association

Texas Tech University
Agriculture museums in the United States
Museums in Lubbock, Texas
Open-air museums in Texas
University museums in Texas
American West museums in Texas
1969 establishments in Texas
Relocated buildings and structures in Texas